John A. Minetto State Park is a public recreation area encompassing  in the towns of Goshen and Torrington, Connecticut. Facilities are available for picnicking, fishing, and cross-country skiing. The state park is managed by the Connecticut Department of Energy and Environmental Protection.

History
The park is part of a flood control project initiated by the U.S. Army Corps of Engineers, who turned the land over to state management following the completion of the Hall Meadow Brook Dam in 1962. Opened under the name Hall Meadow State Park, it was renamed in 1972 in honor of Torrington State Senator John A. Minetto.

References

External links
John A. Minetto State Park Connecticut Department of Energy and Environmental Protection
John A. Minetto State Park Map Connecticut Department of Energy and Environmental Protection

State parks of Connecticut
Parks in Litchfield County, Connecticut
Protected areas established in 1965
Torrington, Connecticut